High Seat is a fell in the centre of the English Lake District. Despite being below 2,000 ft it is the highest point for about 5 miles in any direction; a consequence of the curious fact that the centre of the district is lower than the surrounding parts.

Topography
The main watershed of the Central Fells runs north-south, with Bleaberry Fell forming the northern end of the ridge. High Seat is the next fell to the south, before the land falls to High Tove.

High Seat sends out the spur of Dodd to the north west, separated from the body of the fell by Ashness Gill — a feeder of Watendlath Beck. Oddly, by the time the Gill reaches the famed viewpoint of Ashness Bridge, it has actually become Barrow Beck. The western flank here is clad in broadleaved woodland, but further south along Watendlath Beck this gives way to rock. Reecastle Crag being the principal face.

The southern boundary of the fell is formed by Raise Gill on the western side of the ridge and Shoulthwaite Gill in the east. To say that they drain The Peewits — the hideous bog on the ridge to High Tove — would be untrue, but they are fed by it. Shoulthwaite Gill does not head due east for Thirlmere as might be expected, but turns due north to form the eastern boundary. It is cut off from the reservoir by the lower parallel ridge of Raven Crag and High Rigg and instead makes a beeline for the River Greta. Mere Gill, one of its many tributaries forms the north eastern edge of High Seat. This flows from a point on the ridge to Bleaberry Fell which bears the name of Threefooted Brandreth: (a brandreth being the word for a three-legged stand in an oven on which a griddle was placed when cakes etc. were baked.)

Litt's Memorial
Below Threefooted Brandreth on the eastern slope, sitting on a shallow saddle above Mere Ghyll is the Litt's Memorial. On 9 March 1880 John Litt was following the Blencathra Foxhounds when he inexplicably fell behind and failed to return. A search party found his body at that place the following day. As recorded in the "English Lakes Visitor and Keswick Guardian" for March 1880:
Man found dead on the mountains – Early on Wednesday morning it was reported that two men, named John Litt and John Vickers, who had been following the Blencathra hounds the previous day had not returned. Litt had been last seen on the bog about 200 yards west of Raven Crag where he had been, with other, resting and watching the hounds in the valley below. … Although he seemed somewhat fatigued he did not complain, and the hunters, absorbed in the chase did not look behind. When his absence from home was known a number of willing volunteers went to search for him. … Mr David Powley at once proceeded to Mr Oliver, the shepherd on Castlerigg Fell, who probably was the last person in Litt’s company, and the two immediately struck for the point where Mr Oliver parted from the deceased. They took a dog with them and it found the body not fifteen yards from the place they were making to. The searchers were: Messrs C. C. Thompson, Thos. Hodgson (Station Road), J. W. Grisdale, Thos. Harrison, David Powley, Joseph Bouch, Geo. Atkinson, Isaac Wren, Joseph Bristo, Benjamin Hodgson, A. G. Pettit, and Wm. Wood.

The memorial consists of two upright stones, one bearing a round plate inscribed 'In memory of J Litt who died March 9, 1880'. The second stone bears a faint inscription.

Geology
The summit is covered by peat, overlying the plagioclase-phyric andesite lavas of the Birker Fell Formation. There is a small bed of volcaniclastic sandstone to the south while the northern slopes are predominantly garnet-bearing porphyritic andesite.

Summit
The upper part of the fell, in excess of a mile square, is soft, peaty and drab. The exception is the ridge itself, which is considerably wetter. A fence runs along the ridge, a useful guide in mist and occasionally necessary for bog bouncing. The summit is set on a small rock platform with an Ordnance Survey column. A rocky knoll (called Man) stands on the other side of the fence. The views are extensive due to the central location and a lack of higher neighbours. The Helvellyn range is seen end to end, together with a panorama of high fells on the other side of the ridge from Crinkle Crags in the south to Blencathra in the north.

Ascents
By parking near Ashness Bridge on the road to Watendlath, access to the western side of the ridge can be gained at high level. Ashness Gill can be followed upwards through increasingly wet country until a final bee-line is made for the summit. From further up the road at the base of Reecastle Crag a more direct line is possible, or the climb can be made from Watendlath itself, first ascending High Tove via the zig-zags. The direct ascent noted by Wainwright from the hamlet appears to have access problems.

Eastern approaches begin on the A591 at Rough How Bridge, making a start along the secluded valley of Shoulthwaite before heading up the fellside in the vicinity of Mere Gill.

References

See also

 High Seat, Yorkshire Dales

Fells of the Lake District